Hamburg Police Museum (Polizeimuseum Hamburg) is a museum based within the Hamburg Police Academy in the Hamburg-Winterhude district of Hamburg in northern Germany. It presents around 200 years of policing in the city, forensic methods and criminal cases from the early 20th century onwards. It is co-run by the  Hamburger Polizeiverein.

References

Police
Law enforcement museums in Germany
History of Hamburg